Ketil Kjenseth (born 13 August 1968) is a Norwegian schoolteacher and politician for the Liberal Party.

Personal life 

Kjenseth was born in Lillehammer to Kristen Kjenseth and Gerd Lovise Kjenseth, and grew up in Biri Øverbygd.

Career 

Kjenseth was elected to the Parliament of Norway from Oppland in 2013 where he was member of the Standing Committee on Health and Care Services. He was again elected representative to the Storting for the period 2017–2021, and is a member of the Standing Committee on Local Government and Public Administration.

References 

Liberal Party (Norway) politicians
Members of the Storting
1968 births
Politicians from Gjøvik
Politicians from Lillehammer
Living people
21st-century Norwegian politicians
Norwegian schoolteachers